Pascual B. Racuyal (Tinago, Cebu City, 1911 – Bulacan, 2004) was a Filipino eccentric and aspirant for the Philippine presidency, whose persistent attempts at the presidency earned him folk status. Racuyal sought the presidency in every Philippine presidential election beginning in 1935 against Manuel L. Quezon and Emilio Aguinaldo until 1986 (against Ferdinand Marcos and Corazon Aquino).

Life and attempted political career
He grew up in Barangay Tinago in Cebu City and eventually, became a mechanic at an early age. An unknown fanaticism and will urged him to run for presidency, eventually leading to his flight to Manila, wherein he argued and debated with prominent political figures and became a constant mock-up comedian of sort every presidential election.

Racuyal, a mechanic or garbage collector by profession, was never a credible political figure at any point in his life. His final attempt at the presidency in 1986 was thwarted after the Commission on Elections disqualified him as a “nuisance candidate”.

There were questions as to Racuyal's mental stability. Among his promises should he be elected to the presidency was to construct roads out of plastic to prevent their further deterioration. When he invited Manila Mayor Arsenio Lacson to be his running mate in the 1953 presidential elections, the latter called Racuyal “strictly fiction, utterly fantastic and incredible”. Nonetheless, as time passed, his repeated candidacy provided for an amusing mild diversion to a frequently heated election atmosphere.

Racuyal made it to the ballot twice. In 1935, he got 158 votes or less than 0.01% of the vote. In 1969, he got 778 votes, or just over 0.01% of the vote.

Racuyal died in 2004 in Bulacan and was buried at an undisclosed location.

References

External links
 Pascual B. Racuyal
 Looking for Racuyal

Independent politicians in the Philippines
Candidates in the 1935 Philippine presidential election
Candidates in the 1941 Philippine presidential election
Candidates in the 1946 Philippine presidential election
Candidates in the 1949 Philippine presidential election
Candidates in the 1953 Philippine presidential election
Candidates in the 1957 Philippine presidential election
Candidates in the 1961 Philippine presidential election
Candidates in the 1965 Philippine presidential election
Candidates in the 1969 Philippine presidential election
1911 births
2004 deaths
Politicians from Cebu